Ormož railway station is the railway station in Ormož, Slovenia, which lies on the left bank of the Drava River and borders with Croatia on that river's opposite bank.

The station is located on the Pragersko–Središče Railway line connecting Pragersko, where there is a junction with the main line between Ljubljana and Maribor, with Čakovec in Croatia. From Ormož another line branches off to Murska Sobota and Hodoš.

References

External links 

Official site of the Slovenian railways 

Railway stations in Slovenia